Mario Matías Zaninovic (born 20 March 1987) is an Argentine professional footballer who plays as a midfielder for Deportivo Riestra.

Career
Zaninovic started his career with Lanús. He made the breakthrough into the Primera División club's senior squad midway through 2008–09, making appearances against Gimnasia y Esgrima, Banfield and San Martín; all were away from home. Zaninovic remained for two further seasons, though only appeared twice more for them. On 30 June 2011, Zaninovic joined Ferro Carril Oeste of Primera B Nacional. He scored in his second match, netting in a win over Guillermo Brown on 20 August 2011. He scored a total of five goals in his first season across twenty-eight fixtures, which preceded another sixty-one occurring in four campaigns.

In June 2016, after eighteen months without a senior appearance due to Ferro demotion, Zaninovic signed for Primera B Metropolitana's Estudiantes. Two goals in thirty overall matches followed in 2016–17. Deportivo Riestra completed the signing of Zaninovic on 6 September 2017. His bow didn't come until March, in a Primera B Nacional draw against Flandria; they ended the season with relegation.

Career statistics
.

References

External links

1987 births
Living people
People from Presidencia Roque Sáenz Peña
Argentine footballers
Association football midfielders
Primera Nacional players
Primera B Metropolitana players
Argentine Primera División players
Club Atlético Lanús footballers
Ferro Carril Oeste footballers
Estudiantes de Buenos Aires footballers
Deportivo Riestra players
Sportspeople from Chaco Province